"Evo zore, evo dana" (English translation: Here comes the dawn, here comes the day) is a Croatian marching song It was written after the Black Legion's battle for Kupres in the summer of 1942.

The Black Legion fought off the attack by the Montenegrin Chetniks of Pavle Đurišić and Tito's Partisans.  The name refers to the time between the dawn and full daylight when the Black Legion (Crna Legija) surprised both forces with a counterattack that drove them out of Kupres and its surrounding area. Its lyrical origins are unclear, but some unsourced claims state that it was written by an anonymous poet from Herzegovina.  The lyrics, translated to English, are as follows:

There are more than 40 verses in the original song, but only seven or eight are usually sung.

The seven or eight commonly known verses are these:

Other verses include these:

In 1992, the new version of this song was performed by Dražen Zečić from the album Evo zore, evo dana during the Croatian War of Independence.

1942 songs
Ustaše songs
Independent State of Croatia